Pestalotiopsis leprogena is a fungal plant pathogen infecting bananas.

References

External links

Fungal plant pathogens and diseases
Banana diseases
leprogena